Katarzyna Zillmann (born 26 July 1995) is a Polish rower. She won the gold medal in the quadruple sculls at the 2018 World Rowing Championships as well as silver medal at the 2020 Summer Olympics in Tokyo.

Life and career
She was born in 1995 in Toruń and started practicing rowing at the age of 14. In 2017, she claimed 4th place in the women's quadruple sculls at the 2017 European Rowing Championships and silver medal at the 2017 World Rowing Championships (together with Agnieszka Kobus, Marta Wieliczko and Maria Springwald).

In 2018, she won gold medals at the 2018 European Rowing Championships in Glasgow as well as the 2018 World Rowing Championships in Plovdiv.

In 2019, she won silver medal in the women's quadruple sculls at the 2019 World Rowing Championships.

In 2021, she won silver medal in women's quadruple sculls at the 2020 Summer Olympics in Tokyo (together with Agnieszka Kobus, Marta Wieliczko and Maria Sajdak).
 
In August 2021, she was awarded the Knight's Cross of the Order of Polonia Restituta.

Personal life
Zillmann was one of 168 out sportspeople participating at the 2020 Summer Olympic Games. In 2019, she took part in the "Sport Against Homophobia" social campaign. She is in a relationship with canoeist Julia Walczak. On 21 October 2021, she received the title of Ambassador of LGBT people at the LGBT+ Diamond Awards ceremony.

See also
Poland at the 2020 Summer Olympics
List of Polish sportspeople

References

External links

1995 births
Living people
Polish female rowers
Polish LGBT sportspeople
World Rowing Championships medalists for Poland
Olympic rowers of Poland
Rowers at the 2020 Summer Olympics
Olympic silver medalists for Poland
Medalists at the 2020 Summer Olympics
Olympic medalists in rowing
LGBT rowers